The Talking Glossary of Genetic Terms is an audio/visual glossary of 256 terms prepared and hosted by the National Human Genome Research Institute in the United States.

The first version was published in English online in September 1998 by the NHGRI Office of Science Education under the title of "Talking Glossary of Genetics". The Spanish-language version was released 18 months later.

About

A new multimedia, and significantly updated, version of the English Talking Glossary of Genetics was released by the National Human Genome Research Institute in October, 2009. An identical update of the Spanish-language version was released in October, 2011. In September, 2011, an iPhone App of the English Talking Glossary was released by NHGRI and made available as a free download in the Apple App store. The App version contains all 3-D animations, high quality illustrations, the "Test Your Gene IQ" quiz, and similar user functions such as "Suggest a Term" and "Mail This Term to a Friend."

The original version had been based on simple HTML entries and was developed in the mid-1990s at a time when dial-up modems were commonly used to access the internet at speeds as low as 14.4 kps. That version of the Talking Glossary contained 178 terms and talking explanations of each term, as well as about 70 black-and-white illustrations. 

The new, and current, versions of the Talking Glossary featured a substantial visual, content, and functional upgrade to the popular online tool. The new Glossaries are built on a vibrant FLASH-based web design employing colorful pages, clear digital audio files, color illustrations, 3-D animations, a "Test Your Gene IQ" function, real-time applets to "cite a term in a paper", "suggest a term", and "share a term" via email.

The list of terms was expanded to 256 entries. Terms were chosen using a number of metrics including a review of the online usage of the glossary over the previous decade. Some terms were dropped as a result, and a large number of terms were added. Other metrics used to determine terms included a scan of the most commonly used science books in U.S. K-12 classrooms for terms and concepts, review of all terms suggested by users using the glossary term suggestion function, and a scan of public media and scientific publications for terms.

Developing the Talking Glossary:

The Talking Glossary of Genetics is a science learning tool developed by the National Human Genome Research Institute (NHGRI) at the National Institutes of Health (NIH). NHGRI oversaw the NIH's role in the Human Genome Project, the international research effort aimed at mapping the genes in the human body and developing tools for gene discovery.

Many of the Talking Glossary terms are commonly used today in news reports, by researchers and medical professionals, in classrooms and, increasingly, as part of daily conversation.

In this light, the Glossary was designed to enable people without a formal scientific background to better understand the terms and concepts behind genetic research. Special attention has been paid to users who are learning or teaching genetics in the classroom. However, the Glossary is designed to be valuable for a much wider audience including patients, doctors, nurses, parents, and professionals dealing with genetic concepts and terminology, such as judges, lawyers, law enforcement officials, and others.

The process of developing the Talking Glossary began by examining some of the most popular American middle school and high school science textbooks. Genetics-related terms from these textbooks provided the foundation for the Talking Glossary. These terms are associated with biological concepts addressed by the National Science Education Standards and common in high school and college biology courses. Additional terms not found in textbooks were added to the glossary, reflecting the rapid pace of genetic research and its coverage in the media.

Written Definitions:

Each glossary entry has a written definition that has been reviewed for clarity and accuracy by teams of science educators and genetic researchers. All of the definitions were written by the same Ph.D.-level science writer for consistency and accuracy.

Illustrations:

Most terms have professionally drawn illustrations to further explain a meaning or concept, or place them in context of the cell or a similar biological setting as a means to better explain the term. All illustrations are provided by the medical illustrator/artist at the NHGRI to enable continuity and maximize re-use in learning tools such as slide shows. All illustrations are copyright free.

Each illustration can be viewed as a webpage within the glossary or downloaded as a high-quality PDF file or PowerPoint slide.

3–D Animations:

The Glossary contains many terms that are illustrated with 3-D movie animations. The animations have a non-descript musical background and are purposely not narrated to maximize use. These animations may be played alone or simultaneously with the spoken definition of the term. All cellular organelles have animation sequences, as do many key terms such as gene, cell, ACGT, and chromosome.

Spoken Explanations of Glossary Terms:

Each term features a friendly and informative spoken explanation that can be heard on any computer with sound capabilities by clicking on the "Listen" button on each term page. Spoken explanations can be paused at any point for user convenience.

Each speaker comments on, or defines, terms relevant to their personal field of study. For example, leading cancer researchers comment on cancer, genetic counselors explain genetic testing terms, and expert gene hunters tackle the many terms surrounding the search for or mapping of genes. All speakers are actively working in the field, and most work at NHGRI.

The written definition provides a reasonable definition for each term. The spoken definition is not the same as the written definition. Instead, each speaker was asked to provide information different than the written definition that would expand the listener’s understanding of the term. Speakers were also asked to explain the term to the average person, not another scientist. No speaker was allowed to read, all recorded explanations are spontaneous.

How to Pronounce a Term:

Much of the terminology of genetics and biology is unique in its pronunciation. Below each term name is a “Pronunciation” button. Click the button to hear the term spoken. Each term, regardless of its name, is pronounced.

Information On Each Speaker:

A brief biography and photograph of each speaker accompanies terms listed in the glossary. This enables the user to examine the speaker's credentials and learn more about their research interests.

Related Terms:

If either a written or spoken definition uses other Talking Glossary terms in its text or dialogue, these terms appear in the “Related Terms” listing at the bottom of each term page. The related terms list also includes Glossary terms that reviewers of the Glossary felt would be helpful to the user.

“Test Your Gene Knowledge” Quiz:

The Talking Glossary offers a 10-term quiz designed to be both fun and instructional. The quiz can be accessed from every term page in the Glossary. Users can choose to test their knowledge about terms commonly found in K-16 science classrooms or, more generally, in popular news reports or conversation. The quiz randomly chooses terms from the Talking Glossary and asks the user to select a term name to match the definition shown. Hints are available for each question, and at the end of the quiz all users are able to print a "Certificate of Completion" that includes the date the test was taken, number of correct answers, and the user's name.
About PDF and PPT Files:

PDF (Portable Document Format) files are high-quality image files that appear and print like the original artwork. These finely detailed illustrations will download quickly and include required fonts. PDF files of Glossary illustrations can be downloaded and saved for later uses, such as overhead transparencies, school reports, or for handouts in class or at a talk or other event. Each PDF file is formatted to print on regular printer paper or standard overhead transparency.

Illustrations are also downloadable as PowerPoint slides. These files can be easily copied and pasted into any existing PowerPoint presentation or can serve as a starting point for a new presentation. These slides are designed to provide lecturers with an easy-to-use and convenient source of illustrations for genetic terms and concepts.

Talking Glossary Project Team: 

Project Concept / Project Direction / Digital Audio Interviews:
 Jeffre Witherly, Ph.D.

Illustrations / 3-D Animation:
 Darryl Leja, M.F.A.

Scientific Advisor:
 Lawrence Brody, Ph.D. (English)
 Amalia Dutra, Ph.D. (Spanish)

Contextual Review Team:
 Darryl Leja, M.F.A.; 
 Jeff Witherly, Ph.D.

3-D Animation / Graphics / Design / Programming:
 d’Vinci Interactive

Researchers / Professionals Providing Term Explanations:
Alan E. Guttmacher, M.D.;
Amalia Dutra, Ph.D.; 
Barbara Bowles Biesecker, M.S.; 
Belen Hurle, Ph.D.; 
Bettie J. Graham, Ph.D.; 
Carla Easter, Ph.D.; 
Charles N. Rotimi, Ph.D.; 
Christopher P. Austin, M.D.; 
Colleen McBride, Ph.D.; 
Daphne W. Bell, Ph.D.; 
David M. Bodine, Ph.D.; 
Donald W. Hadley, M.S., C.G.C.; 
Donna Krasnewich, M.D., Ph.D.; 
Elaine A. Ostrander, Ph.D.; 
Elliott Margulies, Ph.D.; 
Eric D. Green, M.D., Ph.D.; 
Fabio Candotti, M.D.; 
Francis S. Collins, M.D., Ph.D.; 
Jeffery A. Schloss, Ph.D.; 
Joan E. Bailey-Wilson, Ph.D.; 
Julie A. Segre, Ph.D.;
Laura L. Elnitski, Ph.D.; 
Lawrence C. Brody, Ph.D.; 
Leslie G. Biesecker, M.D.; 
Maximilian Muenke, M.D.; 
Milton English, Ph.D.; 
Shawn Burgess, Ph.D.; 
Stacie Loftus, Ph.D.; 
Suzanne Hart, Ph.D.; 
Vence Bonham, J.D.; 
William Gahl, M.D., Ph.D.; 
William Pavan, Ph.D.

English Talking Glossary Education and Researcher Review Team:
The English Talking Glossary benefited from a number of professional volunteers who thoughtfully reviewed all elements of the project at various stages. 

Kimberly Agzigian; 
Dana Allen; 
Maria Alvarez; 
Laura Blinderman; 
Leslie Bogar; 
Cynthia Brogan; 
C. Clow; 
Christine Holler-Dinsmore; 
Toby Horn; 
Lynne Ierardi-Curto; 
Victor Ji; 
Sarah Kmet; 
Robin Laurens; 
Robert Marraccino; 
Scott McLaughlin; 
Meg O'Mahony; 
Kristie Parkinson; 
Jill Polk; 
Britt Ravnan; 
Ellen Reinertson; 
Vama Robson; 
Minerva Santerre; 
Sylvia Saunders; 
Doris Withers; 
Mulumbet Worku.

Spanish Talking Glossary Education and Researcher Review Team:
The Spanish Talking Glossary benefited from a number of professional volunteers who thoughtfully reviewed all elements of the project at various stages.

Cecilia Acosta;
Aileen Adizon;
Dolores Arjona;
Felicitas Avendaño;
Jennifer Canale Annal; 
Nelvis Castro; 
Eva De Vallescar; 
Martin Edelberg; 
Rebecca Edelberg; 
Marisela Estrada; 
Pere Estupinya; 
Mario Godoy-Gonzalez; 
Adrianna Gutierrez; 
Mary Gutierrez Phillips; 
Claudia Lewis; 
Diego A. Magallanes; 
Mauricio Medina; 
Michael Melampy; 
David Molina; 
MaryAnn Monroe; 
Corina Ramirez; 
Marisol Reséndiz; 
Erin M. Rivera; 
Andy Rupp; 
James Salazar; 
Ben Seiglie; 
Talia Sussman; 
Jose Vazquez;
Beatriz Villar.

Spanish Talking Glossary Science Advisory Team. The following practicing geneticists constitute the Spanish Talking Glossary Advisory Team along with the Spanish Glossary's Scientific Advisor, Amalia Dutra, Ph.D.:

Mauricio Arcos-Burgos, M.D. / Ph.D.; 
Dolores Arjona, Ph.D.;
Lucio Castilla, Ph.D.; 
Ricardo Espinola, M.D.; 
Jose Luis Franco, M.D.
Suzana Gispert, Ph.D.

References

External links
The Talking Glossary of Genetics
free Apple download 

Glossaries
Genetics literature